Marc G. Genton,  (born September 1969 in Geneva, Switzerland) is currently a Distinguished Professor of Statistics with the King Abdullah University of Science and Technology, (KAUST), Thuwal, Saudi Arabia. He is known as a specialist in Spatio-Temporal Statistics, Data Science and their applications in geophysics, climate science, and marine science. The International Association for Mathematical Geosciences awarded him the Georges Matheron Lectureship in 2020. He is a Fellow of the American Statistical Association (2007), Elected member to the International Statistical Institute (2008), Fellow member of the Royal Statistical Society (2009), Fellow of the Institute of Mathematical Statistics (2010), and Fellow of the American Association for the Advancement of Science (2012).

Education
Ph.D., Statistics, Swiss Federal Institute of Technology, Lausanne, 1996
M.Sc., Applied Mathematics Teaching, Swiss Federal Institute of Technology, Lausanne, 1994
B.Sc., Engineer in Applied Mathematics, Swiss Federal Institute of Technology, Lausanne, 1992

See also 
 International Association for Mathematical Geosciences

References

External links
 Marc G. Genton's page at KAUST

Living people
Georges Matheron Lectureship recipients
1969 births
Academic staff of King Abdullah University of Science and Technology
ETH Zurich alumni
École Polytechnique Fédérale de Lausanne alumni
Spatial statisticians